National Route 313 is a national highway of Japan connecting Fukuyama, Hiroshima and Hokuei, Tottori in Japan, with a total length of 171.5 km (106.57 mi).

References

National highways in Japan
Roads in Hiroshima Prefecture
Roads in Okayama Prefecture
Roads in Tottori Prefecture